Håfreströms IF is a Swedish football club located in Åsensbruk.

External links
 Håfreströms IF – Official website 
http://www.hafrestromsif.se/

Football clubs in Västra Götaland County